Juvenal Niyoyunguruza was a major general in the Army of Burundi.

Niyoyunguruza's death
On 17 September 2009 witness claims two trucks bearing United Nations markings entered the AMISOM compound at Aden Adde International Airport in Mogadishu. Minutes later a twin suicide attack rocket struck the headquarters of AMISOM, killing Juvenal Niyoyunguruza, the deputy commander of AMISOM, and 6 other soldiers. Later the group al-Shabab claimed responsibility for the attack.

References

Assassinated Burundian people
Year of birth missing
2009 deaths
Military of Burundi